Dr Jennie Rosenfeld is the first woman in the history of modern-day Israel to be appointed as the spiritual leader of an Orthodox Jewish community. She was appointed by Orthodox Rabbi Shlomo Riskin. She is also the author of "The Newlywed's Guide to Physical Intimacy", a sexual education book aimed at Orthodox Jews.

Written works and books 
Rosenfeld co-authored the book "The Newlywed's Guide to Physical Intimacy".

She wrote her doctoral thesis in 2008, "Talmudic re-readings: Toward a Modern Orthodox sexual ethic".

References

Israeli Modern Orthodox Jews
Living people
Year of birth missing (living people)
Orthodox women rabbis